James Gilbert E. Wright (March 25, 1874 – August 20, 1961) was a Scottish-born inventor, researcher and chemical engineer at General Electric who invented Silly Putty in 1943 while looking for a replacement for rubber.

The invention of Nutty Putty, later renamed Silly Putty, happened accidentally. During World War II, the United States could not obtain natural rubber from Asian suppliers, who gathered it from rubber trees. The General Electric Company was under a government contract to create an inexpensive substitute for synthetic rubber for the war effort. James Wright, an engineer at General Electric's New Haven laboratory, was working with silicone oil—a clear, gooey compound composed of silicon bonded to several other elements. By substituting silicon for carbon, the main element in rubber, Wright hoped to create a new compound with all the flexibility and bounce of rubber.

In 1943, Wright made a surprising discovery. He mixed boric acid with silicone oil in a test tube. Instead of forming the hard rubber material he was looking for, the compound remained slightly gooey to the touch. Disappointed with the results, he tossed a gob of the material from the test tube onto the floor. To his surprise, the gob bounced. The new compound was very bouncy and could be stretched and pulled. However, it was not a good rubber substitute, so Wright and other GE scientists continued their search.

Seven years later, a toy seller named Peter Hodgson packaged some of Wright's creation in a small plastic egg and presented his new product at the 1950 International Toy Fair in New York. Its first name was Nutty Putty but was changed later due to marketing concerns. It is now called Silly Putty; more than 300 million eggs containing the material have been sold since.

Among Wright's other inventions for the General Electric Company were a method of restoring shrunken celluloid photographic films to their original condition, and a process of treating metals to protect against oxidation and corrosion.

References

External links
 MIT Inventor of the Week: Silly Putty

American inventors